The Leicestershire & Rutland Cricket Board is the governing body for all recreational cricket in the historic counties of Leicestershire and Rutland.

From 1999 to 2003 the Board fielded a team in the English domestic one-day tournament under the name of the Leicestershire Cricket Board, matches which had List-A status.

See also
List of Leicestershire Cricket Board List A players

References

External links
 Leicestershire & Rutland Cricket Board

County Cricket Boards
Cricket in Leicestershire